The Nutty Professor (also known as  The Nutty Professor: Facing the Fear and  The Nutty Professor II) is a 2008 computer-animated science fiction comedy film. It is the sequel to the 1963 live-action Jerry Lewis comedy of the same name and based on the story Strange Case of Dr Jekyll and Mr Hyde by Robert Louis Stevenson. The film is produced by Rainmaker Entertainment and The Weinstein Company and distributed by Genius Products. Lewis reprises his role of Julius Kelp and produces the film. Drake Bell provides the voice of Harold Kelp, Julius' grandson.

The film was released direct-to-video on November 25, 2008.

Plot
Harold Kelp is a young inventor. He is frequently attacked in his visions by his fear, which takes the form of a group of burly dodgeball players as well as a black monster. After encountering an angry mob involved in his bad inventions, Harold is informed by his robot assistant, Robin that he will be sent away to a science academy where his grandfather, Julius Kelp has taken up a duty as Professor.

Upon his arrival, Harold befriends a duo of misfits, Zeke and Ned who welcomes him into their dorm, has a run in with a bully named Brad and meets a beautiful girl named Polly McGregor whom he becomes enamoured with. Wanting to impress Polly, Harold gets his hands on his grandfather's secret elixir, the Secrets of Love, which he believes will help him win her affection. He drinks it, unleashing his cooler, hipper alter ego Jack, who causes mischief.

Jack starts out popular with the students, but his behavior and ego get out of hand. Also, because of Jack, Harold is failing classes. When he learns of Harold's problem, Julius transforms into Buddy Love to teach Harold to be himself. Later on, Harold's fear is accidentally brought to life by one of Julius' inventions, but he manages to defeat it by facing it.

Jack says good-bye to Harold and disappears into him, leaving Harold to share a kiss with Polly.

Voice cast
 Drake Bell as Harold Kelp/Jack
 Jerry Lewis as Prof. Julius Kelp/Buddy Love
 Tabitha St. Germain as Robin
 Britt Irvin as Polly McGregor
 Logan McPherson as Zeke/Waiter/Fear/Ned
 Andrew Francis as Brad/Tad
 Brian Drummond as Dean Von Wu
 Danielle Lewis as Suzy Perkins

Production
On August 8, 2006, Mainframe Entertainment announced The Weinstein Company acquired the rights to produce an animated version of The Nutty Professor, which was distributed direct-to-video by Genius Products Inc. The film was produced under the working title The Nutty Professor 2: Facing the Fear.

There are several references to the original film, including the place where Zeke and Ned perform, called "The Pit." In the original film, the nightclub is called "The Purple Pit." The cast includes Danielle Lewis, the daughter of Jerry Lewis, who cameos as the voice of Harold's neighbor, Suzy Perkins.

Reception
The film has received mixed reviews. Common Sense Media gave it a rating of 2/5, saying "Parents need to know that The Nutty Professor -- also called The Nutty Professor II: Facing the Fear -- doesn't have much to do with the Jerry Lewis classic, even though Lewis does provide the voice of Harold's grandfather. There's lots of bullying, and Harold becomes addicted to the chemical formula he develops. The film is less about facing fear than being overwhelmed by terrifying situations -- stick to the original if you're looking for a good movie for kids."

See also
 The Nutty Professor (film series)

References

External links
 

2008 direct-to-video films
2008 computer-animated films
2000s children's comedy films
American direct-to-video films
2000s American animated films
American children's animated comedy films
American sequel films
Canadian direct-to-video films
Canadian animated feature films
Canadian children's animated films
Canadian sequel films
2000s children's animated films
Dr. Jekyll and Mr. Hyde films
Films about scientists
Films produced by Jerry Lewis
The Nutty Professor
Rainmaker Studios films
Films with screenplays by Evan Spiliotopoulos
The Weinstein Company animated films
2008 comedy films
2008 films
2000s English-language films
2000s Canadian films